Robert Leonard Joswick (born January 12, 1946) is a former American football defensive end who played two seasons for the Miami Dolphins in 1968 and in 1969. He was drafted in the 13th round (334) of the 1968 NFL Draft.

References

1946 births
Miami Dolphins players
American football defensive ends
Players of American football from Pennsylvania
Living people
Tulsa Golden Hurricane football players
People from Uniontown, Pennsylvania